The following highways are numbered 219:

Canada
 Nova Scotia Route 219
 Prince Edward Island Route 219
 Quebec Route 219
 Saskatchewan Highway 219

China
 China National Highway 219

Costa Rica
 National Route 219

India
 National Highway 219 (India)

Japan
 Japan National Route 219

United States
 U.S. Route 219
 Alabama State Route 219
 Arkansas Highway 219
 California State Route 219
 Connecticut Route 219
 Florida State Road 219 (former)
 Georgia State Route 219
 K-219 (Kansas highway)
Kentucky Route 219
 Maine State Route 219
 M-219 (Michigan highway) (former)
 Minnesota State Highway 219
 Montana Secondary Highway 219
 New Mexico State Road 219
 Ohio State Route 219
 Oregon Route 219
 South Carolina Highway 219
 Tennessee State Route 219
 Texas State Highway 219
 Texas State Highway Loop 219
 Utah State Route 219
 Wyoming Highway 219